Marc Cheverie (born February 22, 1987) is a Canadian former professional ice hockey goaltender who played in the American Hockey League (AHL) and the Dundee Stars of the Elite Ice Hockey League (EIHL). Cheverie was selected by the Florida Panthers in the seventh round (193rd overall) of the 2006 NHL Entry Draft.

Playing career
On July 20, 2011, the Florida Panthers announced they had signed Cheverie to a one-year, two way contract
On September 8, 2011, the Florida Panthers traded Cheverie to the Phoenix Coyotes in exchange for Justin Bernhardt.

On June 22, 2012 the Coyotes traded Cheverie, along with Harrison Ruopp and a 2012 third-round draft choice (81st overall), to the Pittsburgh Penguins for Zbynek Michalek.

On September 6, 2012 he signed a one-year deal with the Binghamton Senators. Before joining the Colorado Eagles of the ECHL for the 2013–14 season.

On July 25, 2014, Cheverie signed his first and only contract abroad, agreeing to a one-year deal to end his professional career with the Dundee Stars of the Elite Ice Hockey League (EIHL) while enrolled at the University of Dundee to study a post-graduate Business degree.

Personal
His older brother, Evan was also a professional hockey forward, who played in the AHL and European leagues.

Career statistics

Awards and honours

References

External links

1987 births
Living people
Alumni of the University of Dundee
Binghamton Senators players
Canadian ice hockey goaltenders
Cincinnati Cyclones (ECHL) players
Colorado Eagles players
Denver Pioneers men's ice hockey players
Dundee Stars players
Elmira Jackals (ECHL) players
Florida Panthers draft picks
Gwinnett Gladiators players
Ice hockey people from Nova Scotia
Nanaimo Clippers players
People from Cole Harbour, Nova Scotia
Portland Pirates players
Rochester Americans players
Sportspeople from Halifax, Nova Scotia
Canadian expatriate ice hockey players in the United States
AHCA Division I men's ice hockey All-Americans
Canadian expatriate ice hockey players in Scotland